Albert Chandler (15 January 1897 – January 1963) was an English professional footballer who made over 160 appearances as a right back in the Football League for Derby County.

Personal life 
Chandler served in the Border Regiment and the Machine Gun Corps during the First World War.

Career statistics

References 

English Football League players
Place of death missing
British Army personnel of World War I
English footballers
Newcastle United F.C. players
1897 births
1963 deaths
Footballers from Carlisle, Cumbria
Association football fullbacks
Border Regiment soldiers
Machine Gun Corps soldiers
Carlisle United F.C. players
Derby County F.C. players
Sheffield United F.C. players
Mansfield Town F.C. players
Ebbsfleet United F.C. players
Manchester Central F.C. players
Queen of the South F.C. players
Scottish Football League players